The 9th Mine Countermeasures Squadron is a front-line squadron of the Royal Navy with responsibility for mine warfare in the Persian Gulf region. The squadron is based in Bahrain and, as of 2023, is equipped with three mine countermeasure vessels and a Royal Fleet Auxiliary support ship.

History

1962-1971
In its original guise, the 9th Mine Sweeping Squadron (MSS) was formed of four Ton-class sweepers – HM Ships Appleton, Kemerton, Flockton and Chilcompton which were specially fitted for the rigours of operating in the Persian Gulf. The ships had their pennant numbers painted in Arabic on the stern & carried a funnel badge featuring a dhow on a yellow background.

The squadron was based in Aden and later Bahrain. When Bahrain and Qatar became independent nations and Trucial States formed into the United Arab Emirates the squadron was disbanded.

2013-present
The squadron was reformed in 2013 as the 9th Mine Countermeasures Squadron, the change in title reflecting the advances in mine countermeasures techniques in the intervening forty years. Up until the early 2020s, the squadron usually consisted of two Hunt Class Mine Countermeasure Vessels and two Sandown Class Single Role Minehunters on three yearly rotation, supported by a Royal Fleet Auxiliary Bay Class landing ship, normally RFA Cardigan Bay. As in its original guise, the squadron operates out of HMS Jufair in Bahrain and carries the same funnel badge. 

With the planned retirement of all the remaining Sandown-class vessels by 2025, and their replacement with both autonomous minehunting systems and specialized "motherships" drawn from the Royal Fleet Auxiliary, at minimum a new configuration of the squadron was likely. In February 2023, the autonomous minehunting vessel RNMB Harrier arrived in Bahrain to begin trials of autonomous systems in hot weather. The autonomous vessel will operate from RFA Cardigan Bay.

References

 

Mine Counter-Measures squadrons of the Royal Navy
1962 establishments in the United Kingdom
1971 disestablishments in the United Kingdom
2013 establishments in the United Kingdom